Newcastle Independents, formerly known as Newcastle First, is a localist political party based in Newcastle upon Tyne. Initially established as the Newcastle upon Tyne Community First Party, the party was registered with the Electoral Commission in February 2011 and fielded its first candidates in May 2011. The party changed its name to Newcastle Independents in 2019. , the party has three councillors elected to Newcastle City Council.

Electoral performance 
Newcastle Independents stood for election under the registered description of It's Time to Put Newcastle First from 2011 to 2019 with some candidates standing under the registered description of Local Community Candidate in 2018 and 2019.

In 2019, the party won its first council seat, with Ian Donaldson being elected in Callerton & Throckley Ward and the party coming second in both Lemington and Denton & Westerhope Wards.

On 6 May 2021, two more candidates were elected to Newcastle City Council, with the party now having a total of three councillors.

Local campaigns 
Newcastle Independents has led a number of campaigns including:

 Campaigning for the Tyne and Wear Metro to be extended into Northumberland.
 Campaigning to prevent housing being built on green belt land.
 Creating a People's Mayor, if Newcastle established an elected mayor for the city.
 Calling for the creation of a council-owned energy company.
 Highlighting the state of grass cutting in Newcastle.
 Campaigning to stop the closure of Blackett Street to traffic.

References

External links
 

Locally based political parties in England
Political parties established in 2011
2011 establishments in England